Purbadhala is an upazila of Netrokona District  in the Division of Mymensingh, Bangladesh.

Geography
It has 44799 households and total area 308.3 km2. It is bounded by Durgapur and Kalmakanda upazilas on the north, Kendua and Gauripur upazilas on the south, Barhatta and Atpara upazilas on the east, Purbadhala upazila on the west.

Demographics
According to 2011 Bangladesh census, Purbadhala had a population of 310,834. Males constituted 49.27% of the population and females 50.73%. Muslims formed 94.80% of the population, Hindus 4.81%, Christians 0.19% and others 0.20%. Purbadhala had a literacy rate of 42.78% for the population 7 years and above.

As of the 1991 Bangladesh census, Purbadhala had a population of 235,675. Males constituted 50.79% of the population, and females 49.21%. This Upazila's eighteen up population was 114,878. Purbadhala had an average literacy rate of 23% (7+ years), and the national average of 32.4% literate.

Administration
Netrokona Thana was formed in 1874 and it was turned into an upazila in 1983.

Purbadhala Upazila is divided into 11 union parishads: Agia, Bairaty, Bishkakuni, Dhalamulgaon, Ghagra, Gohalakanda, Hogla, Jaria, Khalishaur, Narandia, and Purbadhala. The union parishads are subdivided into 224 mauzas and 336 villages.

Chairman:Sujon, from Awame League
Vice Chairman: Masum Mostofa, from Jamayet e Islam

See also
Upazilas of Bangladesh
Districts of Bangladesh
Divisions of Bangladesh

References

 
Upazilas of Netrokona District